Holehaven Creek is a  biological Site of Special Scientific Interest (SSSI) between Canvey Island and Corringham in Essex.

The SSSI consists of Holehaven Creek itself and part of the adjoining East Haven Creek and Vange Creek. It is part of the Thames Estuary, and drains the surrounding marshes into the river. It has been designated an SSSI because its intertidal marshes and mudflats support nationally important (and sometimes internationally) numbers of wintering black-tailed godwits. Curlews and dunlins are also sometimes present in nationally significant numbers.

The channel up the creek is accessible to small boats, and the Thames Estuary Path runs along its eastern boundary.

References 

Sites of Special Scientific Interest in Essex